Plays Fats Waller is an album by American jazz organist Jimmy Smith featuring performances of tunes associated with Fats Waller recorded in 1962 and released on the Blue Note label.

Reception
The Allmusic review by Steve Leggett awarded the album 4 stars, stating

Track listing
All compositions by Fats Waller except as indicated
 "Everybody Loves My Baby" (Jack Palmer, Spencer Williams) – 3:47
 "Squeeze Me" – 5:31
 "Ain't She Sweet" (Milton Ager, Jack Yellen) – 3:37
 "Ain't Misbehavin'" (Harry Brooks, Andy Razaf, Waller) – 3:44
 "Lulu's Back In Town" (Al Dubin, Harry Warren) – 5:16
 'Honeysuckle Rose" (Andy Razaf, Waller) – 6:57
 "I've Found a New Baby" (Palmer, Williams) – 6:03
Recorded at Rudy Van Gelder Studio, Englewood Cliffs, New Jersey, on January 23, 1962

Personnel

Musicians
Jimmy Smith – organ
Quentin Warren – guitar
Donald Bailey – drums

Technical
 Alfred Lion – producer
 Rudy Van Gelder – engineer
 Reid Miles – design
 Francis Wolff – photography
 Del Shields – liner notes

References

Blue Note Records albums
Jimmy Smith (musician) albums
1962 albums
Albums recorded at Van Gelder Studio
Albums produced by Alfred Lion